UFC on Fox: Holm vs. Shevchenko (also known as UFC on Fox 20) was a mixed martial arts event produced by the Ultimate Fighting Championship held on July 23, 2016, at United Center in Chicago, Illinois.

Background
The event was headlined by a women's bantamweight bout between former UFC Women's Bantamweight Champion Holly Holm and multiple-time Muay Thai world champion Valentina Shevchenko.

A bout between former UFC Light Heavyweight Championship challengers Anthony Johnson and Glover Teixeira was expected to serve as the co-main event. However, Johnson pulled out on June 18 to tend to personal issues. In turn, promotion officials elected to pull Teixeira from the card and the pairing was left intact and rescheduled to take place four weeks later at UFC 202.

Ryan LaFlare was expected to face Alexander Yakovlev at the event. However, LaFlare was removed from the fight in early June after sustaining an undisclosed injury and was replaced by The Ultimate Fighter: American Top Team vs. Blackzilians winner Kamaru Usman.

Anthony Rocco Martin was expected to face Michel Prazeres at the event. However, Martin pulled out on July 6 due to a neck injury and was replaced by promotional newcomer J.C. Cottrell.

George Sullivan was expected to face Héctor Urbina, but was pulled from the event due to a "potential compliance issue" with the UFC's anti-doping policy stemming from "voluntarily disclosed information" he provided to USADA. Urbina still weighed in as a potential backup opponent should there be a need for him to compete in another bout. Since that did not materialize, he will be re-booked for another card in the near future.

Results

Bonus awards
The following fighters were awarded $50,000 bonuses:
Fight of the Night: Jason Knight vs. Jim Alers
Performance of the Night: Felice Herrig and Eddie Wineland

See also
List of UFC events
2016 in UFC

References

Fox UFC
Events in Chicago
Mixed martial arts in Chicago
Sports competitions in Chicago
2016 in mixed martial arts
July 2016 sports events in the United States